Maricela Velázquez Sánchez (born 2 October 1982) is a Mexican politician affiliated with the PRI. As of 2013 she served as Deputy of the LXII Legislature of the Mexican Congress representing Morelos.

In June 2015 Velázquez has participated as a candidate in the municipal presidential elections for the city of Cuernavaca, the capital of the Mexican state of Morelos.  She was narrowly defeated in the race by the former footballer Cuauhtémoc Blanco.

References

1982 births
Living people
People from Cuernavaca
Women members of the Chamber of Deputies (Mexico)
Institutional Revolutionary Party politicians
21st-century Mexican politicians
21st-century Mexican women politicians
Universidad Autónoma del Estado de Morelos alumni
Politicians from Morelos
Members of the Chamber of Deputies (Mexico) for Morelos